Blackley Cemetery is a large, municipal cemetery situated within the northern suburbs of the city of Manchester, and is owned, operated and maintained by Manchester City Council. The cemetery and crematorium complex is located on Victoria Avenue in the district of Blackley. It was opened in 1953 on land that was previously a golf course.

The cemetery contains Blackley Crematorium, the only crematorium facility operated by Manchester City Council (the other crematorium in the city, the Manchester Crematorium at Southern Cemetery, being an independent company), opened in 1959. The crematorium features 3 chapels – one large, central chapel, with twinned smaller chapels to the eastern and western sides of the building. The crematory area of the crematorium is equipped with 3 'Newton'-model cremators, installed by the Furnace Construction Co. Ltd. of Hyde, Cheshire.

The cemetery was, at one time, well known for having problems with drainage, with surface water being problematic during burials and visitation to grave sites. The city has worked to rectify this situation in recent years, with the installation of ground drainage schemes being completed in 2009. The ground drainage scheme has opened up new areas for the opening of new graves, in parts of the cemetery that were originally thought to be unusable.

A currently unused area of the cemetery is to be developed into a Natural Burial area. This project is currently in the planning and problem-solving stage, and it is as yet unknown when the new burial area will be opened for use.

Notable burials

Buried here in the Non-Conformist section is Ethel Carnie Holdsworth (1886–1962), working-class writer, feminist, and socialist activist.

In 1991, the remains of 63 executed prisoners (of which 45 were identifiable) that had been exhumed from unmarked graves in the Strangeways Prison cemetery following rebuilding work at the prison, were cremated at Blackley Crematorium. The cremated remains were re-interred in two graves (plot C2710 and C2711) at the adjacent cemetery. They included the remains of the three Manchester Martyrs – who had been hung at the New Bailey Prison in Salford, Manchester on November 23, 1867 for the killing of a policeman.

Blackley Crematorium was the venue for the funeral in 1994 of Coronation Street actress Doris Speed and in 2007 of Bernard Manning, the Manchester-born comedian. Manning had previously visited the centre chapel of the crematorium building to pre-record a video piece to be played at his funeral service.

The grave of Corporal Clifford Haughton, Royal Regiment of Fusiliers and his wife and children stands in the cemetery. They were all killed by the IRA in 1974 in the M62 coach bombing, when a time bomb exploded on their coach en route to Catterick.

References

External links
 

Geography of Manchester
Cemeteries in Manchester